The LCDR B class was a class of 0-6-0 steam locomotives of the London, Chatham and Dover Railway. The class was designed by William Kirtley and introduced in 1876.

The locomotives passed to the South Eastern and Chatham Railway in 1899. And given new boilers between 1899 and 1903. They were all withdrawn and scrapped between 1912 and 1915.

References

B
0-6-0 locomotives
Railway locomotives introduced in 1876
Scrapped locomotives
Standard gauge steam locomotives of Great Britain